Golam Mostofa  (1897 – 13 October 1964) was a Bengali writer and poet.

Early life and education
Mostofa was born in 1897, in the village of Manoharpur in Shailkupa Thana, which was a part of the District of Jessore but presently in Jhenaidah District, Bangladesh. He was born to a Bengali Muslim family of literature-enthusiasts that were also proficient in Arabic and Persian, in addition to Bengali. His father, Golam Rabbani, and his grandfather, Qazi Golam Sarwar, were both folk poets.

Mostofa finished his primary education in Damukdia, then spent two years studying in Fazilpur. He passed the Entrance exam in 1913 from Shailkupa High School. He passed BA from Ripon College in 1918 and BT from David Hare Training College in 1922.

Career 
Mostofa started teaching at Barrackpore Government High School in January 1920. Four years later, he transferred to the Calcutta Hare School and later the Calcutta Madrasa. He became the Deputy Head at the Baliganj Government Demonstration High School, eventually become the first Muslim headmaster of the school. In 1940, he moved to Bankura District School and numerous other schools, before retiring as headmaster of Faridpur Zila School in 1949.

He was the secretary of the East Bengal Government's Language Reform Committee, formed in 1949. He believed in the two-nation theory that formed the basis for the ideals of Pakistan, and supported Urdu as Pakistan's state language during the Language Movement of 1952.
Islamic heritage was one of his inspirations. His book Biswanabi (1942), a biography based on the life of the Islamic prophet Muhammad, provided him with wide recognition.

Works

Mostofa wrote his first poem, Adrianople Uddhar, in tenth grade, which got published by The Mohammadi. After that, he wrote for forty-eight years. His works included poetry, biographies, novels, articles and translations of Arabic and Urdu works.

Poetry:
 Roktorag (1924)
 Khoshroz (1929)
 Kabbo Kahini (1932)
 Sahara (1936)
 Hasnahena (1938)
 Bulbulistan (1949)
 Tarana-i-Pakistan (1956)
 Bani Adam (1958)
 Geeti Shonchalon (1968)
 Gulistan
 Prarthona
 Kishore
 Qobor
 He Khoda Doyamoy Rahmanur Rahim
 Badshah Tumi Deen O Duniyar, Nikhiler Chiro Shundor Srishti
 Amar Muhammad Rasul

Biography
 Bishwanabi (1942)

Novels
 Ruper Nesha
 Bhangabuk
 Ek Mon Ek Pran

Others
 Islam O Communism (1946)
 Islame Jehad (1947)
 Amar Chintadhara (1952)
 Maru Dulal

Translations
Musaddas-e-Hali (1941)
Kalam-e-Iqbal (1957)
Shikwa O Jowab-e-Shikwa (1960)
Al Quran (1958)
Joy Porajoy (Ikhwan As-Safa)

Awards
Sitara-i-Imtiaz
President Medal

Personal life 
Mostafa had four sons and three daughters. One of the sons, Mostafa Monowar, became a puppeteer and former director general of the state-run Bangladesh Television. Kobi Golam Mostafa's youngest son Mostafa Farooq (Pasha) was the first pianist in Bangladesh. He studied in Royal College of Music,London England.In the year of celebration of 100-anniversary of Karol Szymanowski in Poland. The Minister of Culture and Art awarded Mr. Farooq a prestigious commemorial medal as a proof of appreciation for introducing the Polish Classical music to the nation. He came back  to Bangladesh after completing his bachelor's in Music and started his profession as a Music Teacher. Kobi Golam Mostafa is the grandfather of Syed Mainul Hossain, an architect who designed Jatiyo Smriti Soudho at Savar. He is the great-grandfather of Bangladeshi software engineer and Academy Scientific and Technical Award winner Nafees Bin Zafar.

Death and legacy 
Mostafa died on 13 October 1964 at the age of 67, of cerebral thrombosis.

In 2014, the ancestral home of Mostafa in Jhenaidah was under threat from two land grabbers, who claimed partial ownership of the land.

Many artifacts used by Mostofa and valuable photographs drawn by his second son Mostafa Aziz, sole artist of the first pencil sketch of the poet, were found to be in a pitiable condition at the village. Though Kabi Golam Mustafa Memorial Library received a concrete building at the yard of the poet's house in 2008 implemented by the Zila Parishad, Jhenidah, at a cost of Tk 1.70 million, there are, virtually, no reading materials were found to be there. Some parental property of the poet, including his paternal land and trees are secretly being sold, reliable sources.

References

Further reading
 Muslim Sahitya Prativa by Helal M. Abu Taher published by Islamic Foundation, Dhaka 1980.
 Dakhil Bangla Sahitya

1890s births
1964 deaths
People from Jhenaidah District
20th-century Bengali poets
Bengali-language poets
Surendranath College alumni
University of Calcutta alumni
Bengali male poets
Honorary Fellows of Bangla Academy
People from Khulna District
Bengali Muslims